The 1985 Marshall Thundering Herd football team was an American football team that represented Marshall University in the Southern Conference (SoCon) during the 1985 NCAA Division I-AA football season. In its second season under head coach Stan Parrish, the team compiled a 7–3–1 record (3–3–1 against conference opponents) and played its home games at Fairfield Stadium in Huntington, West Virginia.

Schedule

References

Marshall
Marshall Thundering Herd football seasons
Marshall Thundering Herd football